Edwardian Hotels is a British hotel company, founded by Jasminder Singh in 1975. The company has 13 hotels, mostly located in central London, England.

Notable properties include the 404-room The May Fair, which was purchased from InterContinental Hotels Group in 2003.

In 1993, Edwardian Hotels partnered with Radisson Hotels. Several of the company's properties were rebranded as Radisson Blu, including Radisson Blu Edwardian Heathrow Hotel and Radisson Blu Edwardian Hampshire Hotel.

References

Hotels established in 1975
Hotel chains in the United Kingdom
1975 establishments in England